Aleksander Midtsian (born  2 October 1982) is a Norwegian footballer and coach who plays for Siddis Sportsklubb in Norway as of 2017. Newly appointed manager of Brodd FK, also highest earner at the club.

New Zealand
Because of a transfer technicality, Midtsian was unable to play in the opening round of the 2003-04 National Soccer League, much to the discomfiture of Football Kingz. He then made his debut in a 1-2 loss to Sydney United, scoring his team's only goal in the 53rd minute.

Personal life
He is the son of Geir Midtsian.

References

External links 
 

Association football defenders
Football Kingz F.C. players
Norwegian footballers
Norwegian First Division players
Bryne FK players
Footballers from Oslo
Ullensaker/Kisa IL players
1982 births
Living people
Expatriate association footballers in New Zealand
Norwegian expatriate footballers
Lyn Fotball players
KFUM-Kameratene Oslo players
Manglerud Star Toppfotball players
Kristiansund BK players